Filatima fuliginea is a moth of the family Gelechiidae. It is found in North America, where it has been recorded from Texas.

The wingspan is 15–17 mm. The forewings are grey closely irrorated dark fuscous. The stigmata are hardly perceptible, but the plical is sometimes preceded and followed by minute white specks. The hindwings are grey.

References

Moths described in 1929
Filatima